CS Gloria 2018 Bistrița-Năsăud, commonly known as Gloria Bistrița, is a professional women's handball club in Bistrița, Bistrița-Năsăud, Romania, that competes in the Liga Naţională.

Gloria Bistrița reached the quarterfinals of the EHF European League in 2020 when they were eventually knocked out by Herning-Ikast Håndbold.

Kits

Honours

Domestic competitions
Liga Națională (National League of Romania) 
 Third place: 2018–19

Cupa României (National Cup of Romania) 
 Third place: 2016–17

In European competition 
Participations in EHF Cup: 1x

Team

Current squad

Goalkeepers

 20  Iulia Dumanska
 21  Alexandra Perianu
 87  Renata Arruda
Wings
LW
 2  Nicoleta Dincă (c) 
 3  Paula Posavec

RW
 14  Željka Nikolić
 30  Sonia Seraficeanu

Pivots
 10  Florina Chintoan
 77  Tamires Morena Lima

Backs 
LB
 5  Jelena Trifunović 
 8  Maria Ţanc 
 14  Bianca Bazaliu
 23   Déborah Kpodar  
 44  Kristina Munteanu-Korodi
CB 
 4  Laura Pristăviță
 13  Cristina Laslo 
 18  Nina Zulić

RB

 55  Melinda Geiger
 95  Cristina Marcu

Staff members
  Head Coach: Horațiu Pașca
 
  Goalkeeper Coach: Mihaela Ciobanu
  Fitness Coach: Ștefan Ciuntu
  Physiotherapist: Cătălin Rațiu
  Masseur: Alexandru Chiuzan

Transfers
Transfers for the 2023-24 season.

 Joining
  Ida-Marie Dahl (LP) (from  Viborg HK)
  Natalia Nosek (RB) (from  ESBF Besançon)
  Gnonsiane Niombla (LB/CB) (from   Paris 92) 
  Seynabou Mbengue Rodríguez (RB) (from  BM Remudas)

 Leaving
  Nina Zulić (CB) (to  RK Krim)

Notable former players
  Oana Țiplea  
  Mariana Costa  
  Darly Zoqbi de Paula

References

External links
  

Romanian handball clubs
Sport in Bistrița
Handball clubs established in 2009
2009 establishments in Romania